Samaresh Basu (11 December 1924 – 12 March 1988) was an Indian writer in modern Bengali literature, known for his versatility and vast range of themes. He wrote under the pen name Kalkut. Basu was awarded the 1980 Sahitya Akademi Award in Bengali, by Sahitya Akademi, India's National Academy of Letters, for his novel, Shamba. He won the 1983 Filmfare Awards for Best Story for Namkeen.

Biography
Basu was born on 11 December, 1924 in Bikrampur, Dhaka (present day Bangladesh). He married Gauri Basu in 1942.
In his early days, he worked at a factory at Icchapore, West Bengal. He was imprisoned between 1940 to 1950 for his involvement in trade unions and Communist party. It was in prison, he penned his first published novel, Uttaranga. After release, he devoted his time entirely to writing, refusing his old job offer. He wrote over 200 short stories and 100 novels under the pen names, Kalkut and Bhromor
, revolving around themes of political activism, middle class life and sexuality, two of which were banned for a brief period with charges of obscenity.
Basu received the Sahitya Akademi Award for Shambo in 1980 and Filmfare Award for Namkeen in 1983.

Samaresh Basu died on 12 March 1988.

Works
 Aam Mahato
 Aboseshe
 Achinpurer Kathokata
 Apadartho (Ananda Pub.)
 Aparichito (Sahityam,1985)
 Baghini
 Bibar (Ananda Publishers, 1965), made as a film in 2006, it is also mentioned in Mrinal Sen's 1971 film Interview.
 Bibekban/Bhiru
 Bijon Bibhui (Ananda Pub.)
 Bijorito (Anjali Prakashoni)
 B.T.Roader Dhare, translated as The Hollow by Saugata Ghosh
 Chaya Dhaka Mon
 Daho
 Dekhi Nai Phire (Ananda Pub.)
 Dosh Deen Pore (Ananda Pub.,1986)
 Dui Aronyo (Anjali Prakashoni)
 Ganga (Maushumi Prakasani,1974)
 Goenda Ashok Thakur Samogro[1] (Anjali Prakashoni)
 Hariey Pawa (Nath Publishing)
 Hridayer Mukh
 Jabab (Deys Publishing,1986)
 Jhile Nagar (Karuna Prakashoni)
 Jug Jug Jiye (Ananda Pub. & Lokbharati,1990)
 Kamona Basona
 Ke Nebe More
 Khondita (Ananda Pub.)
 Mahakaler Rother Ghora, translated in English as Fever (Ananda Publishers)
 Marsumer Ek Din (Annyadhara, 1979)
 Mohamaya (Modern Publishers,1988)
 Nithur Dorodee
 l'Noyonpurer Mati (Nath Publishing)
 Padokkhep
 Pancho Bonhi (Sahityam)
 Pathik
 Patok (Anjali Prakashoni)
 Prajapoti (Ananda Publishers,1985)
 Prakriti
 Pran Protima
 Punaryatra (Ananda Pub.)
 Raktim Basonto
 Ranir Bazar (Nath Publishing)
 Samaresh Basu Rochonaboli [1–13] (Ananda Pub.)
 Shalgherir Simanay
 Sekol Chera Haater Khoje (Ananda Pub.,1984)
 Swarnochanchu
 Tanaporen (Anjali Prakashoni)
 Teen Purush (Ananda Pub.)
 Tin Bhubaner Pare (Maushumi Prakasani,1982)
 Uddhar (Mandal, 1986)

Work as Kalkut
 Amrita Bisher Patre, (Ananda Pubishers)
 Amrita Kumbher Sandhaney ,translated as In Search of the Pitcher of Nectar (Bengal Publishers Pvt Ltd, 1954)
 Arab Sagorer Jol Lona
 Dhyan Jnan Prem (Ananda Pub.)
 Ek Je Chhilen Raja (Ananda Pub.)
 Juddher Shesh Senapoti (M.C.Sarkar & Sons)
 Kalkut Rachona Samagro [1–8] (Maushumi Prakasani)
 Kothaay Pabo Tarey (Ananda Pub.)
 Ponnyo Bhume Punya Snan (Ananda Pub.)
Pritha (Mondal Book House, 1957)
 Purno Kumbho Punascho (Ananda Pub.)
 Shambo (Ananda Pub.)
 Prachetosh

Works For Children Audiences
 Adrisya Manusher Haatchani (Sarodiya Suktara,1986)
 Bandha Ghore'r Awaz (Ananda Pub.,Nov 1979)
 Bhul Barite Dhuke (Ananda Pub.,1986,Sarodiya Anondomela,1985)
 Bideshi Garite Bipod (Ananda Pub.,Apr 1988,Sarodiya Anondomela,1987)
 Buno Hati'r Bandhuttwo (Pujabarshiki Anondomela Sankalan, Sarodiya Anondomela,1977,illustration – Sudhir Maitro)
 Goa i Gogoler Prothom Kirti (Pujabarshiki Anondomela Sankalan, Sarodiya Anondomela,1978)
 Gogol Amonibas (Nath Publishing)
 Gogol Chikkus Nagalande (Ananda Pub.)
 Gorokhkhonathbabur Notebook (Pakhik Anondomela Sera Sankalan,25 June 1986,illustration – Debashish Deb)
 Jangal Mohol E Gogol (Ananda Pub.,1987,Sarodiya Anondomela,1986)
 Jonaki Bhuter Bari (Pujabarshiki Anondomela Sankalan, Sarodiya Anondomela,1980, illustration – Sunil Shil)
 Jwor'er Ghore Shona (Pakhik Anondomela Sera Sankalan,23 December 1987,illustration – Anup Roy)
 Sei Gari'r Khoje (Ananda Pub.,Aug 1984, Sarodiya Anondomela,1983)
 Simul Gore'r Khune Bhut (Ananda Pub.)

Gogol Omnibus
Samaresh Basu created a character Gogol (Detective) for children. Most of the stories are assembled in Gogol Omnibus.
 Aayna Niye Khelte Khelte
 Adrishya Manusher Haatchani Sarodiya Suktara,1986)
 Buno Hati'r Bandhuttwo (Sarodiya Anondomela,1977)
 Chora Hati Shikari
 Durger Garhkhai Er Durghatono
 Garadheen Jaanalay Rakkhos
 Gogol Kothay? (Sarodiya Anondomela,1981)
 Gogoler Keramati
 Gogoler Royraja Uddhar
 Harano Buddhagupti
 Indurer Khut khut
 Jonaki Bhuter Bari (Sarodiya Anondomela,1980)
 Kairong Moth Er Gogoler Kando
 Mahishmardini Uddhar
 Pashchimer Balcony Theke
 Rajdhani Expresser Hatya Rahasya
 Ratna Rahasya O Gogol
 Sonali Parer Rahashya
 Telephone Aaripatar Bipad (Sarodiya Suktara)

Adaptations

Films 
A number of films are based on his works including-
 Ganga (1960 film) (1960) by Rajen Tarafdar
 Nirjan Saikate (1963) by Tapan Sinha
 Teen Bhubaner Pare (1969) by Ashutosh Bandhopadhyay
 Calcutta 71 (1972) by Mrinal Sen
 Mouchak (1974) by Aurobindo Mukhopadhyay
 Chhera Tamsuk (1974) by Purnendu Pattrea
 Bikele Bhorer Phool ( 1974) by Piyush Basu
 Chhutir Phande ( 1975 ) by Salil Sen  , Honeymoon (2018) by Premendra Bikash Chaki ( remake of Chhutir Phande on same story)
 Kitaab (1977) and Namkeen (1982) by Gulzar
 Shaukeen (1982) directed by Basu Chatterjee
 Amrita Kumbher Sandhane (1982) by Dilip Roy
 Paar  (1984) by Goutam Ghose
 Genesis (1986) by Mrinal Sen
Prajapati (film) (1993) by Biplab Chatterjee
 Uttara (2000) by Buddhadeb Dasgupta
 Nater Guru (2003) by Haranath Chakraborty
 Bibar (2006) by Subrata Sen
 In 2013, a film adaptation of Basu's story, Sonali Parer Rahashya of Gogol Omnibus, was released with the title Goyenda Gogol.Directed by Arindam Dey, the film featured child actor Ahijit Ghosh as Gogol, along with veteran actors like Indraneil Sengupta, Saheb Chatterjee and Rachana Banerjee.
 A sequel of Goyenda Gogol, named Gogoler Kirti was released in 2014. Directed by Pompy Ghosh Mukherjee, the film is based on two stories by Samaresh Basu- Royraja Uddhar and Mahishmardini Uddhar. Actor Ahijit Ghosh reprising his role as Gogol from the previous film.

References

Bengali writers
Writers from Kolkata
Recipients of the Sahitya Akademi Award in Bengali
1988 deaths
People from Bikrampur
1924 births
20th-century Indian novelists
Indian male novelists
Filmfare Awards winners
Indian male short story writers
Recipients of the Ananda Purashkar
20th-century Indian short story writers
Indian children's writers
Novelists from West Bengal
20th-century Indian male writers